20000 series may refer to:

Japanese train types
 Kintetsu 20000 series EMU
 Odakyu 20000 series RSE EMU
 Nankai 20000 series EMU
 Seibu 20000 series EMU
 Sotetsu 20000 series EMU
 Tobu 20000 series EMU